Nepenthes 'Miranda' is a cultivar of a manmade hybrid involving N. maxima and N. northiana. For some authors it is a more complex hybrid.

Description
This perennial carnivorous tropical plant is classified as a Lowland, Intermediate, and sometimes even Highland, due to its Highland and Lowland ancestry. It produces peculiar pale green pitchers with red-brown speckles and an almost vertical mouth with a dark reddish-brown peristome. These pitchers can reach a height up to a foot .

See also
List of Nepenthes cultivars

References
Registered Cultivar Names: Nepenthes. International Carnivorous Plant Society

External links
Le piante carnivore
Infos Carnivores
Terra Forums

Miranda